Linkeroever  (Literal translation: Left bank) is an area in the city of Antwerp, on the left bank of the Scheldt river. Historically it was a neighbourhood which belonged to Zwijndrecht, but on 19 March 1923, it was attached to Antwerp. Linkeroever has a population of 16,545 (2021). Before receiving its current name the area was known as "Borger Weert Polder".

Notable buildings in Linkeroever 
 Chicagoblok (Europark)

See also 
 Antwerpen-Linkeroever, a now defunct railway station in service between 1844 and 1984.

References

External links 
 Official district website

Geography of Antwerp
Populated places in Antwerp Province
Cross country running venues